Kowner is a surname. Notable people with the surname include:

 Elyasaf Kowner (born 1970), Israeli artist
 Rotem Kowner (born 1960), Israeli historian and psychologist

See also
 Kovner